Yakima Meadows was a horse racing track located in Yakima, Washington.

The track closed in 1998 after 37 years of operation. It is a one-mile (1.6 km) dirt oval with seating for about 3,500 fans.

References 

Defunct sports venues in Washington (state)
Buildings and structures in Yakima, Washington
Defunct horse racing venues in Washington (state)